Skraastad is a Norwegian surname. Notable people with the surname include:

 Johannes Skraastad (1648–1700), Norwegian artist
 Kristoffer Skraastad (1865–1948), Norwegian farmer and politician

Norwegian-language surnames